Constantino de Sá de Noronha was the 6th and 8th Governor of Portuguese Ceylon. De Noronha was first appointed in 1618 under Philip II of Portugal, he was Governor until 1622 and then in 1623 until 1630. He was killed during the Battle of Randeniwela in a last stand after refusing to abandon his troops. Several accounts, though varying in accuracy, describe the moment of his death in detail.  

The Journal of Robert Knox (1681);"The General, seeing that defeat, and himself like to be taken, called his black boy (slave) to give him water to drink, and snatching the knife that stuck by his boy’s side, stabbed himself with it" The Journal  of João Ribeyro (1681);"The General, having done his duty as a chieftain and a soldier, threw himself in the midst of the enemy and cut down all who were bold enough to remain near him, till pierced with balls and arrows he fell dead on a heap of enemies whom he had slain."He was succeeded by Jorge de Albuquerque and Filipe Mascarenhas respectively.

References

Governors of Portuguese Ceylon
16th-century Portuguese people
17th-century Portuguese people